= Phosphatoantimonate =

Phosphatoantimonates are compounds that contain anions that contain phosphorus and antimony in the +5 oxidation state, along with oxygen. Thus they are a compound of phosphate and antimonate, bound together by oxygen.

phosphatoantimonates have been investigated as catalysts, and ion exchange materials.

== List ==
| formula | mw | crystal system | space group | unit cell Å | volume | density | comment | references |
|---|---|---|---|---|---|---|---|---|
| SbOPO_{4} | | monoclinic | C2c | a = 6.791 b = 8.033 c = 7.046 β = 115.90° Z=4 | | | | |
| Sb^{III}Sb^{V}_{3}(PO_{4})_{6} | | trigonal | R3̅ | a = 16.880 c = 21.196 Z=12 | 5230 | | mixed valence | |
| HSb(PO_{4})_{2}·2H_{2}O | | | | | | | layered; can be exfoliated; can exchange H^{+} with other ions; can reversibly dehydrate | |
| H_{3}Sb_{3}P_{2}O_{14}•xH_{2}O | | | | | | | layered | |
| H_{5}Sb_{5}P_{2}O_{20}•xH_{2}O | | | | | | | 3D with channels | |
| Li_{5}Sb_{5}P_{2}O_{20} | | | | | | | | |
| (NH_{4})_{3}Sb_{3}P_{2}O_{14}•3H_{2}O | | | | | | | | |
| Na_{3}SbO(PO_{4})_{2} | | orthorhombic | P2_{1}2_{1}2_{1} | a = 6.964 b = 9.284 c = 12.425 Z = 4 | | | 1D | |
| Na_{3}Sb_{3}P_{2}O_{14} | | | | | | | | |
| Na_{5}Sb_{5}P_{2}O_{20} | | | | | | | | |
| Mg_{0.50}SbFe(PO_{4})_{3} | | hexagonal | P3̅ | a = 8.3443 c = 22.3629 Z=6 | | | nasicon | |
| KSb_{2}PO_{8} | | monoclinic | Cc | a=12.306 b=7.086 c=15.037 β=95.82° Z=8 | 1304.5 | 4.498 | colourless; 3D | |
| KSb_{2}PO_{8−x}N_{y} | | | | | | | | |
| KSbP_{2}O_{8} | | rhombohedral | R3 | a = 4.7623 c = 25.409 Z = 3 | | | 2D | |
| K_{2}SbPO_{6} | | orthorhombic | Pnma | a= 9.429 b= 5.891 c= 11.030 Z= 4 | | | 1D | |
| 4K_{2}O · 4Sb_{2}O_{5} · P_{2}O_{5} · 8H_{2}O K_{8}Sb_{8}P_{2}O_{29}·8H_{2}O | | monovlinic | | a = 23.952 b = 9.515 c = 8.193 β = 124.77° | | | ^{31}P NMR shift −−6.77 ppm | |
| K_{3}Sb_{3}P_{2}O_{14} | | rhombohedral | R3m | a = 7.147 c = 30.936 Z = 3 | | | reversible hydration; 2D | |
| K_{3}Sb_{3}P_{2}O_{14}, 1.32H_{2}O | | rhombohedral | R3m | a = 7.147 c = 30.936 Z=3 | | | | |
| K_{3}Sb_{3}P_{2}O_{14}·5H_{2}O | | hexagonal | P3̅ | Z=6 | | | | |
| K_{5}Sb_{5}P_{2}O_{20} | | orthorhombic | Pnnm | a= 23.443 b= 18.452 c= 7.149 z= 6 | | | 3D | |
| K_{2}SbAs_{0.5}P_{0.5}O_{6} | | orthorhombic | | | | | | |
| ScSb^{V}_{3}(PO_{4})_{6} | | monoclinic | P2_{1}/n | a=11.810 b=8.616 c=8.400 β=90.80° | 854.6 | | | |
| NaSbCr(PO_{4})_{3} | | rhombohedral | R3̅ | a = 8.329 c = 22.094 Z=6 | 1327 | | nasicon | |
| Ca_{0.5}AlSb(PO_{4})_{3} | | | | a=8.56 c=21.87 | | 4.128 | nasicon | |
| Mn_{0.50}SbFe(PO_{4})_{3} | | rhombohedral | R3̅ | a=8.375 c=21.597 | | | nasicon | |
| Mn_{0.5}AlSb(PO_{4})_{3} | | rhombohedral | R3̅c | a=8.270 c=21,799 | | 3.56 | nasicon | |
| Ca_{0.5}CrSb(PO_{4})_{3} | | | | a=8.61 c=22.08 | | 4.321 | nasicon | |
| Mn_{0.5}CrSb(PO_{4})_{3} | | monoclinic | P2_{1}/n | a=12.280 b=8.814 c=8.613 β=91.03° | | 3.45 | | |
| Sb_{1.50}Fe_{0.50}(PO_{4})_{3} | | hexagonal | R32 | a=8.305 c=22.035 | | | | |
| (Sb_{0.50}Fe_{0.5}0)P_{2}O_{7} | | orthorhombic | Pna2_{1} | a=7.865 b=15.699 c=7.847 | | | pyrophosphate | |
| CaSb_{0.50}Fe_{1.50}(PO_{4})_{3} | | rhombohedral | R3̅c | a=8.514 c=21.871 | | | nasicon | |
| Ca_{0.50}SbFe(PO_{4})_{3} | | rhombohedral | R3̅ | a=8.257 c=22.276 | | | nasicon | |
| Mn_{0.5}FeSb(PO_{4})_{3} | | rhombohedral | R3̅c | a=8.374 c=21.593 | | 3.68 | nasicon | |
| NaSbFe(PO_{4})_{3} | | rhombohedral | R3̅ | a = 8.361 c = 22.222 Z=6 | 1345 | | nasicon | |
| Co[Sb(PO_{4})_{2}]_{2}·6H_{2}O | | | | | | | | |
| Ni_{0.50}SbFe(PO_{4})_{3} | | hexagonal | P3̅ | a = 8.3384 c = 22.3456 | | | nasicon | |
| Rb_{3}Sb_{3}P_{2}O_{14} | | | | | | | | |
| Rb_{3}Sb_{3}P_{2}O_{14}•3H_{2}O | | rhombohedral | R3̅m | a=7.1445 c=31.802 | | | | |
| Rb_{5}Sb_{5}P_{2}O_{20} | | | | | | | | |
| Sr_{0.50}SbFe(PO_{4})_{3} | | rhombohedral | R3̅ | a = 8.227 c = 22.767 | | | nasicon | |
| SrSb_{0.50}Cr_{0.50}(PO_{4})_{2} | | monoclinic | C2/c | a= 16.5038 b= 5.1632 c= 8.0410 β = 115.85° Z=4 | 617 | | yavapaiite | |
| SrSb_{0.50}Fe_{1.50}(PO_{4})_{3} | | rhombohedral | R3̅c | a = 8.339 c = 22.704 | | | nasicon | |
| Sr(Sb^{V}_{0.50}Fe^{III}_{0.50})(PO_{4})_{2} | | monoclinic | C2/c | a = 16.5215 b = 5.1891 c = 8.0489 β = 115.70° Z=4 | | | yavapaiite | |
| Sr(Ga_{0.5}Sb_{0.5})(PO_{4})_{2} | | monoclinic | C2/c | a=16.455; b=5.158 c= 8.005 β=115.49° Z=4 | 613 | | | |
| YSb^{V}_{3}(PO_{4})_{6} | | | R3̅ | a=17.019 c=21.233 | 5326 | | | |
| Cd_{0.50}SbFe(PO_{4})_{3} | | rhombohedral | R3̅ | a=8.313 c=21.996 | | | nasicon | |
| Sb^{V}_{1.50}In^{III}_{0.50}(PO_{4})_{3} | | monoclinic | P2_{1}/n | a=11.801 b=8.623 c=8.372 β=90.93° | | | | |
| Sb^{V}_{0.50}In^{III}_{0.50}P_{2}O_{7} | | orthorhombic | Pna2_{1} | a=7.9389 b=16.0664 c=7.9777 | | | pyrophosphate | |
| InSb^{V}_{3}(PO_{4})_{6} | | monoclinic | P2_{1}/n | a=11.792 b=8.622 c=8.379 β=90.91° | 851.8 | | | |
| NaSbIn(PO_{4})_{3} | | rhombohedral | R3̅ | a=8.329 c = 23.031 Z=6 | 1383 | | nasicon | |
| Cs_{3}Sb_{3}P_{2}O_{14}•3H_{2}O | | rhombohedral | R3̅m | a=7.153 c=32.840 | | | | |
| Cs_{4}MgSb_{6}P_{4}O_{28} | 1858.39 | tetragonal | I4_{1}/a | a=16.5170 c=10.7355 Z=4 | 2928.8 | 4.22 | band gap 4.50 eV | |
| Cs_{4}ZnSb_{6}P_{4}O_{28} | | tetragonal | I4_{1}/a | a=16.4821 c=10.7453 Z=4 | 2919.1 | 4.32 | band gap 4.48 eV | |
| K_{0.8}Ba_{1.6}Sb_{4}O_{9}(PO_{4})_{2} (0 < x < 0.4) | | orthorhombic | Pnma | a = 20.998 b = 7.168 c = 9.569 | | | | |
| Ba_{2}Sb_{4}O_{9}(PO_{4})_{2} | | orthorhombic | Pnma | a = 20.9237 b = 7.1836 c = 9.5189 Z = 4 | | | | |
| BaSb_{0.50}Cr_{0.50}(PO_{4})_{2} | | monoclinic | C2/m | a= 8.140 b= 5.175 c= 7.802 β = 94. 387° Z=2 | 328 | | yavapaiite | |
| BaSb_{2/3}Mn_{1/3}(PO_{4})_{2} | | monoclinic | C2/m | a= b= c=7.8808 β=94.4° Z=2 | 337 | | | |
| Ba(Sb_{0.50}Fe^{III}_{0.50})(PO_{4})_{2} | | monoclinic | C2/m | a = 8.1568 b = 5.1996 c = 7.8290 β = 94.53° Z=2 | | | yavapaiite | |
| BaSb_{2/3}Co_{1/3}(PO_{4})_{2} | | monoclinic | C2/m | c=7.8581 β=94.7° Z=2 | 333 | | | |
| BaSb_{2/3}Cu_{1/3}(PO_{4})_{2} | | monoclinic | C2/m | c=7.8795 β=95.3° Z=2 | 331 | | | |
| BaSb_{2/3}Zn_{1/3}(PO_{4})_{2} | | monoclinic | C2/m | c=7.8497 β=94.8° Z=2 | 332 | | | |
| Ba(Ga_{0.5}Sb_{0.5})(PO_{4})_{2} | | monoclinic | C2/m | a= 8.106 b= 5.178 c= 7.806 β=94.79° Z=2 | 327 | | | |
| Tl_{3}Sb_{3}P_{2}O_{14}•3H_{2}O | | rhombohedral | R3̅m | a=7.135 c=31.447 | | | | |
| PbSb_{0.50}Cr_{0.50}(PO_{4})_{2} | | monoclinic | C2/c | a= 16.684 b= 5.156 c= 8.115 β = 115.35° Z=4 | 631 | | yavapaiite | |
| Pb(Sb_{0.50}Fe^{III}_{0.50})(PO_{4})_{2} | | monoclinic | C2/c | a = 16.6925 b = 5.1832 c = 8.1215 β = 115.03° | | | yavapaiite | |
| PbSb_{0.50}Fe_{1.50}(PO_{4})_{3} | | rhombohedral | R3̅c | a = 8.313 c = 23.000 Z=6 | 1377 | | nasicon | |
| Pb_{0.50}SbFe(PO_{4})_{3} | | rhombohedral | R3̅ | a = 8.2397 c = 22.7801 Z=6 | 1339 | | nasicon | |
| Pb(Ga_{0.5}Sb_{0.5})(PO_{4})_{2} | | monoclinic | C2/c | a=16.622 b=5.163 c=8.067 β=114.85° | 628 | | | |
| BiSb^{V}_{3}(PO_{4})_{6} | | trigonal | R3̅ | a=17.034 c=21.260 | 5342.1 | | | |
| CaSb_{0.50}Bi_{1.50}(PO_{4})_{3} | | monoclinic | P2_{1}/m | a = 4.9358 b = 6.9953 c = 4.7075 β = 96.2° | | | | |
